Dharm samrat swami Hariharanand Saraswati (1907–1980) popularly known as Swami Karpatri (so called because he would eat only what would come in his palm 'kara', as the bowl 'pātra'), was born as Har Narayan Ojha into a Saryupareen Brahmin family of a village called Bhatni in Pratapgarh, Uttar Pradesh, India. He was a sannyasi in the Hindu Dashanami monastic tradition.

Childhood
As a child, Swami Karpatri had no interest in worldly matters. He was married to Srimati Mahadevi at the age of 9 in the year 1916. Even after his marriage, he tried to leave his home in search of truth but failed.

His father said "I would allow you to leave home only if you become father of child and give us a grandchild"; a girl child was born, and Karpatri left his home at the age of 19.

Education
He went to Sangved Vidyalaya and started his Sanskrit grammar education in 1926. After this, he studied Vedanta and other darshanas from Swami Vishveshvarashrama. After his years of learning, including three years in icy caves in the Himalaya, he was ordained as a sannyasi.

Dharm Sangh
On the day of Vijayadashmi, He established Dharm Sangh in the year 1940. He travelled through all parts of India and established many branches of Dharm Sangh. The Slogan was:

He revived the lost traditions of Varanasi.

Dharm Sangh under leadership of Swami Karpatri helped the Noakhali victims of 1946 riots and provided them land, food and financial aid.

He re-converted Hindus who were forcibly made Muslims and gave them initiation under Rama-Nama.

He and his group was the first one to be jailed in Independent India. Even before Independence, In the year 1947, he started protests and meetings from the month of April. On the night of 14 August 1947, the members of Dharm Sangh were raising the slogans of "Bharat Akhand Ho" (May Bharat be united), All of them were jailed.

Later life 
He was a disciple of Shankaracharya of Jyotir Math Swami Brahmananda Saraswati. He spent most of his life at Varanasi.

Swami Nishchalananda Saraswati, the 145th Govardhan Peeth Shankaracharya of Puri, Odisha, is an eminent disciple of Swami Karpatri.

He initiated Alain Daniélou, a noted French Historian into Shaivite Hinduism under the name, Shiv Sharan.

Politics
Other than DharmSangh, In 1948, Swami Karpatri founded the Akhil Bharatiya Ram Rajya Parishad, A traditionalist Hindu party. 
He led a movement against the Hindu Code Bill. He was also a prominent agitator in 1966 anti-cow slaughter agitation. On 18 April 1948, he founded the newspaper Sanmarg which promoted Sanatan Dharma and also advocated against the Hindu Code Bill and voiced opposition on cow slaughters.

Death

On the day of his demise in the year 1980 “Magh Shukla Chaturdashi”, he asked his disciples to sing the "Ayodhya Tyaga" story of Ramayana for him; he himself did the recitation of Sri Sukta and at the end by keeping the idol of Krishna on his chest, he died by reciting "Shiva Shiva Shiva" thrice.

Debates
Swami Karpatri maintained no-compromise policy with regards to Hindu laws and Shastras. He was called Dharmasamrata(English: The Emperor of Dharma) by the masses.  

In 1932, when he was in his late 20s, he debated Pandit Madan Mohan Malaviya on the topic Pranava (ॐ). Unable to Answer Swami Karpatri's arguments, Malaviya accepted his defeat. This incident was later published in the book "Mananiya Prashnottara".

A debate took place in 1964; this one was between Sanatani Pandits and Arya Samaj. Swami Karpatri was just a viewer in the debate, but he later joined the debate with Yudhisthir Mimansak. 

Another debate took place in 1965 between Swami Karpatri and Madhvacharya Sri Vidyamanya Teerth. Sri Vidyamanya challenged people to defend Advaita Siddhanta. Swami Karpatri accepted the challenge, The debate went on for 2 days. In the end, the mediator "Sri Bhagvatananda" declared Swami karpatri ji victorious.

Books
Marxwad Aur Ramrajya: Criticism of Modern Ideologies such as Marxism, Feminism etc.

Vichar Piyush: A Summary of Swami Karpatri's Thoughts.

Bhakti Sudha: An anthology of various articles written by Swami Karpatri on importance of Bhakti.

Bhagwat Sudha: Explaining the Essence of Srimad Bhagvat Puran.

Sri Radha Sudha: A record of Swami Karpatri's speeches on Radha Sudha Nidhi.

Bhakti Rasarnava: A Unique work on Bhakti.

Pibata Bhagvata Rasamalaya: A Book dealing with Rasa of Srimad Bhagvata Purana.

Kaal Mimansa: A work dealing with the chronology in context of the Pauranic and Other Hindu Epic literature.

Kya Sambhog se Samadhi: A Simple Refutation of Osho's interpretation of Samadhi.

Capitalism, Socialism and Ramrajya: Refuting Osho's shallow understanding on these Ideologies.

Ramayana Mimansa: A Book with systematic analysis of the Hindu Epic Ramayana.

Ved Ka Swaroop Aur Pramanya: The epistemological significance and Structure of the Vedas.

Veda Pramanya Mimansa: Establishing the supreme authority of Vedas.

VedaSwarupVimarsh: A Short book defining the swarupa of Vedas while refuting the claims of Social Reformers and Modern day Scholars Like Swami Dayanand.

Samanvaya Samrajya Samrakshanam:A work dealing with coordination between various schools of Hinduism.

Ahamartha aur Parmartha Sara: A commentary on Patanjali's work "Parmarth Sara" with the refutation of Vishishta Advaita View.

Nastika-Astika Vaad: A point to point refutation of Nastika Arguments used against Astikas.

Videsh Yatra Shastriya Paksha: The Views of Hindu Shastras on Travelling Abroad.

Sankirtan Mimansa evam Varnashrama Dharma: A text Describing the maintenance of Varnashrama Dharma along with Holy Enchanting.

Rss aur Hindu Dharma: Deals with Structural criticism of Sangh-Sponsored Anti-Shastra ideology.

Gau - Ek Samagra Chintan: The importance of Cow within Hinduism and Humanity as a whole.

Vedartha Parijata: Explaining the True Essence of the Vedas along with Commentary.

Kumbha Tithyadi Nirnaya: A treatise dealing with the astrological conclusions in context of Tithis and Kumbha Parva.

Yajurveda Commentary: Bhashya (Commentary) of Shukla Yajurveda by Swami Karpatri in eight parts.

Further reading

Lutgendorf, Philip. 1991. The Life of a Text: Performing the Rāmcaritmānas of Tulsidas. Berkeley: University of California Press, pp. 384–387.

References 

1907 births
1982 deaths
Advaitin philosophers
20th-century Hindu philosophers and theologians
People from Pratapgarh, Uttar Pradesh
Scholars from Varanasi
People from Gorakhpur district
20th-century Indian philosophers
Akhil Bharatiya Ram Rajya Parishad politicians
Indian Hindu religious leaders